Pietro Vecchia may refer to:

 Pietro della Vecchia (1603–1678), Italian painter
 Pietro Vecchia (bishop) (1628–1695), Roman Catholic prelate